Srboljub Nikolić (1 April 1965 – 4 February 2022) was a Serbian football player and manager who played as a forward.

Player career 
Nikolić started his club playing career in his hometown with FK Mladost Goša (current name GFK Jasenica 1911), where he played through youth categories to senior team. Nikolić initiated his international career when he joined Enosis Neon Paralimni in 1992 to play in Cypriot First Division. In 1995 he won the Cyprus Championship with Anorthosis Famagusta scoring 23 goals (16 in the league 16, six in the cup, one in the UEFA Cup). 

Nikolić was very dedicated to football training and played until the age of 44. He played for teams from several countries including Yugoslavia, Cyprus, Turkey, Greece, Serbia, Bosnia and Herzegovina and Montenegro.

Personal life and death
Outside of football, Nikolić led a quiet life. He was married and had a son. Nikolić died on 4 February 2022, at the age of 56.

References

External links
 Srboljub @ Aris Limassol FC Fan FB Page
 Srboljub @ Aris Limassol FC Fan Twitter Page
  Srboljub Nikolic @ Eurosport

1965 births
2022 deaths
Serbs of North Macedonia
Sportspeople from Skopje
Serbian footballers
Association football forwards
HNK Šibenik players
FK Bor players
Enosis Neon Paralimni FC players
Anorthosis Famagusta F.C. players
Aris Limassol FC players
Anagennisi Deryneia FC players
Serbian expatriate footballers
Serbian expatriate sportspeople in Cyprus
Expatriate footballers in Cyprus